Kei Kato may refer to:

Rome Kanda, Japanese tarento, comedian and actor who has worked under the alias of Kei Kato
Kei Katō, a Japanese women's professional shogi player

See also
Kei (disambiguation)
Kato (disambiguation)